This is a list of cricket umpires who have officiated in at least one men's Twenty20 International (T20I) match. As of March 2023, 354 umpires have officiated in a men's T20I match. In November 2020, in the second T20I between Pakistan and Zimbabwe, Pakistan's Ahsan Raza stood in his 50th T20I match as an on-field umpire, becoming the first umpire to reach the milestone in the format.

References

International cricket umpires
Umpires
Twenty20 International cricket umpires